Hollywood, Tennessee, is the ninth studio album by American country music singer Crystal Gayle. Released in August 1981, it peaked at #5 on the Billboard Country Albums chart.

As the title intends to suggest, half of the album was produced in a pop music style, whilst the other half was produced in a "Tennessee" country music style. It includes four singles released in 1982 and 1983 which appeared on the Billboard Country charts: "The Woman in Me" (#3), "You Never Gave Up on Me" (#5), "Living in These Troubled Times" (#9), and "Keepin' Power" (#49).

Track listing

Personnel
Crystal Gayle - lead vocals
Chris Leuzinger, Jon Goin - guitar
Joe Allen, Tommy Cogbill - bass
Alan Steinberger - keyboards
Charles Cochran - keyboards, vibraphone, string arrangements
Bobby Wood - piano
Gene Chrisman, Kenny Malone - drums, percussion
Buddy Spicher - fiddle, mandolin
Wanda Vick - mandolin
Denis Solee - saxophone
Billy Puett, Sam Levine - flute
The Sheldon Kurland Strings - strings
Dennis Good - horn arrangements
Technical
Garth Fundis - recording, mixing
Virginia Team - art direction
Norman Seeff - photography

Charts

Weekly charts

Year-end charts

References

Crystal Gayle albums
1981 albums
Albums produced by Allen Reynolds
Columbia Records albums